Folklore in the Old Testament: Studies in Comparative Religion, Legend, and Law is a 1918 book by the anthropologist Sir James George Frazer, in which the author compares episodes in the Old Testament with similar stories from other cultures in the ancient world. While less well known than The Golden Bough (1890), Frazer's other major work, it is still considered a milestone in comparative folklore.

External links
 Folklore in the Old Testament Studies in Comparative Religion Legend and Law Volume I in the Internet Archive
 Volume II at the same website

References

1918 non-fiction books
Books about the Bible
Books by James George Frazer
English-language books
Jewish folklore
Mythology books
Old Testament
Comparative mythology